George (1778 – 20 November 1807) was a Georgian prince of the Bagrationi house of Imereti and claimant to the crown of Imereti. He was the ancestor of the Bagration-Imeretinsky, princes of the Russian Empire.

George was the only son of Alexander, son of Solomon I of Imereti, of his marriage with Princess Darejan née Tsulukidze, which was not authorized by the church. Alexander had led an abortive revolt against Solomon in 1778, but then reconciled with him. He died before his father and Solomon's death in 1784 left the issue of Imeretian succession open to rivaling claims. George was designed as heir apparent at Solomon's death, but was prevented from being crowned by Solomon's cousin David II, who was in turn overthrown by Solomon's nephew Solomon II. The latter arrested George as a pretender to the throne and imprisoned him at the Mukhuri castle in 1795. George was able to escape on 15 October 1806 and fled to the Russian Empire where he spent his last years, writing memoirs of his life. He died of smallpox at St. Petersburg and was buried there, at the St. Alexander Nevsky Convent.

George was married to Princess Darejan, of the Eristavi of Racha (1779–1816), and fathered two sons – Alexander and Dimitry Bagration-Imeretinsky, both generals of the Russian army. Darejan and her sons were deported from Imereti to Russia proper after the Russian conquest of that kingdom in 1810.

Issue
 Alexander Bagration-Imeretinsky (1796–1862)
 Dimitry Bagration-Imeretinsky

References

1778 births
1807 deaths
Bagrationi dynasty of the Kingdom of Imereti
Georgian princes
Deaths from smallpox